Sheath is the third and final studio album by British IDM project LFO. It was released by Warp on 22 September 2003. It peaked at number 27 on the UK Independent Albums Chart.

Critical reception
At Metacritic, which assigns a weighted average score out of 100 to reviews from mainstream critics, Sheath received an average score of 73% based on 13 reviews, indicating "generally favorable reviews".

John Bush of AllMusic gave the album 4 stars out of 5 and called Mark Bell "the most imaginative producer in British techno." Dominique Leone of Pitchfork gave the album a 7.3 out of 10, writing, "Bell's strength seems to reside in his softer sides that fools me into thinking his more extroverted outings are lacking."

Paul Sullivan of BBC wrote, "the album manages to re-capture some of the original pioneering spirit that made Frequencies such a tour-de-force." Joshua Klein of Billboard said, "The drum machines sound delightfully (if deceptively) rinky-dink, and the absence of vocalists keeps the focus on the beats and occasionally cacophonous sonic clutter."

Track listing

Charts

References

External links
 

2003 albums
LFO (British band) albums
Warp (record label) albums
Albums with cover art by The Designers Republic
Albums produced by Mark Bell (British musician)